China Telecom Corp., Ltd. is a Chinese telecommunications company. It is one of the red chip listed companies of state-owned China Telecommunications Corporation. Its H shares have been traded on the Stock Exchange of Hong Kong since 15 November 2002. It is a constituent of the Hang Seng China Enterprises Index, the index for the H shares of state-controlled listed companies. The company was also listed on the New York Stock Exchange until January 2021. China Telecom is the second-largest wireless carrier in China, with 362.49 million subscribers as of June 2021.

China Telecom was a brand of China Telecommunications Corporation, but after the market liberalization of China, the state-owned enterprise spun off the brand and operated it as a separate company, floating it on the Hong Kong Stock Exchange.

History
China Telecom Corp., Ltd. was incorporated on 10 September 2002 as a limited company in order to float some of the assets of the group on the stock exchange, specifically the wireline telecommunications businesses in Shanghai, Guangdong, Jiangsu, and Zhejiang, as well as other assets from the parent company.

In 2011, e-commerce business and video media business were acquired by China Telecom's subsidiaries E-surfing Pay and E-surfing Media. However, E-surfing Media was sold back to the parent company in 2013.

In 2015, China Telecom formed a joint venture China Tower with fellow state-owned telecommunication companies China Mobile and China Unicom. China Tower, which was the largest telecommunications tower group by revenue, became a separate listed company in 2018. China Telecom, China Mobile and China Unicom were remained the largest clients of China Tower .

In August 2015, Chang Xiaobing, former chairman of China Unicom, became the chairman of China Telecom as well chairman of China Telecommunications Corporation. While , who previously served in these two positions, was appointed to the same positions in China Unicom. However, Chang was investigated for corruption in December 2015 and resigned. He was sentenced to six years imprisonment in 2017.

In 2016, China Telecom was responsible for illegally intercepting communications between the governments of Canada and Korea.

Expansion outside Mainland China
China Telecom (Europe) said on 23 October 2008 it would expand its Asian and European services, aiming to increase its market share in Europe. China Telecom (Europe) became part of China Telecom Corp., Ltd. in 2013.

In 2008, China Telecom acquired China Unicom (Macau). The subsidiary was renamed to  In 2015, China Telecom (Macau) acquired a 4G LTE license from the Macau S.A.R. authority. The 4G service started in the same year.

In May 2011, China Telecom formed a strategic partnership with the German software group SAP to offer a cloud-based version of SAP's business software to small and medium companies in China.

China Telecom, in partnership with Vodafone, was one of the bidders for a license in the newly opened mobile telecommunications market in Myanmar.

U.S. sanctions 

In January 2021, China Telecom was delisted from the NYSE in response to a US executive order. The same year, the Federal Communications Commission (FCC) revoked China Telecom's operating license in the U.S. for national security reasons. However, China Telecom (Americas) Corp plans to keep offering other services on United States soil. In March 2022, the FCC designated China Telecom (Americas) Corp a national security threat.

Subsidiaries

 China Telecom (Americas) Corporation
 China Telecom (Europe) Limited

Equity interests

 Besttone Holding (6.13%)

Shareholders

See also
 List of largest companies by revenue
 List of telephone operating companies
 List of telecommunications regulatory bodies

References

External links
 

Companies listed on the Hong Kong Stock Exchange
Companies formerly listed on the New York Stock Exchange
Chinese companies established in 2002
Telecommunications companies established in 2002
Telecommunications companies of China
Government-owned companies of China
Internet service providers of China
Mobile phone companies of China
Companies based in Beijing
Chinese brands
H shares